Jakub Vadlejch (born 10 October 1990) is a Czech track and field athlete who competes in the javelin throw. He is a three-time Olympian for the Czech Republic, having competed in 2012, 2016 and 2020, winning a silver medal in 2020. He also has represented his country five times at the World Championships in Athletics (2011, 2015, 2017, 2019 and 2022), winning the bronze medal in 2022 and silver medal in 2017, and four times a competitor at the European Athletics Championships (2010, 2014, 2016 and 2018). He also won the 2016 IAAF Diamond League title.

Career
Born in Prague, Vadlejch took part in international javelin competitions from a young age, reaching the finals at the 2007 World Youth Championships in Athletics, 2008 World Junior Championships in Athletics and the 2009 European Athletics Junior Championships. His senior debut followed at the 2010 European Athletics Championships, where he threw in qualifying only. He competed in the javelin throw at the 2012 Summer Olympics and placed 25th with a mark of 77.61 metres. He was eliminated in the qualifying round at the 2011 World Championships in Athletics, 2014 European Athletics Championships, and 2015 World Championships in Athletics.

Vadlejch had his breakthrough season in 2016. At the 2017 World Championships he set his new personal best, winning the silver medal.

2021 Tokyo Olympic 
He won the silver medal in the Men's Javelin throw event. He finished at the second spot behind India's Neeraj Chopra.

International competitions

Circuit wins
Diamond League
Overall title: 2016
London Grand Prix: 2016
Meeting Areva: 2016
Weltklasse Zürich: 2016

Seasonal bests
2008 – 76.57 m
2009 – 81.95 m
2010 – 84.47 m
2011 – 84.08 m
2012 – 80.40 m
2013 – 75.85 m
2014 – 82.97 m
2015 – 86.21 m
2016 – 88.02 m
2017 – 89.73 m
2018 – 89.02 m
2019 – 85.78 m
2020 – 84.31 m
2021 – 86.67 m
2022 - '''90.88 m

References

1990 births
Living people
Athletes from Prague
Czech male javelin throwers
Olympic athletes of the Czech Republic
Athletes (track and field) at the 2012 Summer Olympics
Athletes (track and field) at the 2016 Summer Olympics
Athletes (track and field) at the 2020 Summer Olympics
World Athletics Championships athletes for the Czech Republic
World Athletics Championships medalists
Diamond League winners
Czech Athletics Championships winners
Medalists at the 2020 Summer Olympics
Olympic silver medalists in athletics (track and field)
Olympic silver medalists for the Czech Republic
European Athletics Championships medalists